Nela Pocisková (born 4 October 1990 in Bratislava) is a Slovak singer and actress who represented Slovakia at the Eurovision Song Contest 2009 with Kamil Mikulčík. They failed to reach the Eurovision final.

In 2010, she won the fourth season of Let's Dance, the Slovak version of Dancing with the Stars.

Singles

 2009: Leť tmou (& Kamil Mikulčík)
 2010: Posledný deň (& Vladis)
 2011: Neviem sa nájsť
 2012: So in Love
 2013: Mysterious boy

Albums

 2013: WAR

Charts

Awards

See also
 The 100 Greatest Slovak Albums of All Time

References

External links

1990 births
Living people
Eurovision Song Contest entrants of 2009
Eurovision Song Contest entrants for Slovakia
21st-century Slovak women singers
Musicians from Bratislava